Atlético Sport Aviação, commonly known as ASA, is a basketball club from Luanda, Angola. The club's men's team competes at the local level, at the Luanda Provincial Basketball Championship and in the Angolan Basketball League.

In its history, ASA has been present as well as at the continental level, at the annual African Basketball Club Champions League competitions.

Honours

Roster

Depth chart

Staff

Former managers

Former notable players

Players

2011-2018

1991–2000

 = Angola league winner

See also
ASA Football
ASA Handball
BIC Basket
Federação Angolana de Basquetebol

References

External links
AfricaBasket profile

Basketball teams established in 1953
Sports clubs in Angola
Basketball teams in Angola
1953 establishments in Angola